Stanislav Kulinchenko (born 19 April 1971) is a Russian handball player.

He played for the Russia men's national handball team at the 2000 Summer Olympics in Sydney, where Russia won the gold medal.

References

External links

1971 births
Living people
People from Samarqand Region
Soviet male handball players
Russian male handball players
Olympic handball players of Russia
Handball players at the 2000 Summer Olympics
Olympic gold medalists for Russia
Olympic medalists in handball
Medalists at the 2000 Summer Olympics